Colasposoma ovatum is a species of leaf beetle from Senegal. The species was first described in 1923 by Julien Achard, from Sédhiou in the Casamance region.

References

ovatum
Beetles of Africa
Insects of West Africa
Beetles described in 1923